Gregg Haakonsen (born 10 May 1980) is a Zimbabwean cricketer. He played four first-class matches for CFX Academy cricket team in 1999/2000.

References

External links
 

1980 births
Living people
Zimbabwean cricketers
CFX Academy cricketers
Sportspeople from Gweru